Guy Geoffroy (born 26 May 1949 in Paris) is a French member of the National Assembly of France.  He represents the Seine-et-Marne department,  and is a member of the Union for a Popular Movement.

References

1949 births
Living people
Politicians from Paris
The Republicans (France) politicians
United Republic politicians
Mayors of places in Île-de-France
Chevaliers of the Légion d'honneur
Knights of the Ordre national du Mérite
Deputies of the 12th National Assembly of the French Fifth Republic
Deputies of the 13th National Assembly of the French Fifth Republic
Deputies of the 14th National Assembly of the French Fifth Republic